The 14th British Independent Film Awards, held on 4 December 2011 at the Old Billingsgate Market in central London, honoured the best British independent films of 2011.

Awards

Best British Independent Film
 Tyrannosaur
 Senna
 Shame
 Tinker Tailor Soldier Spy
 We Need to Talk about Kevin

Best Director
 Lynne Ramsay – We Need to Talk about Kevin
 Ben Wheatley – Kill List
 Steve McQueen – Shame
 Tomas Alfredson – Tinker Tailor Soldier Spy
 Paddy Considine – Tyrannosaur

The Douglas Hickox Award
Given to a British director on their debut feature
 Paddy Considine – Tyrannosaur
 Joe Cornish – Attack the Block
 Ralph Fiennes – Coriolanus
 John Michael McDonagh – The Guard
 Richard Ayoade – Submarine

Best Actor
 Michael Fassbender – Shame
 Brendan Gleeson – The Guard
 Neil Maskell – Kill List
 Gary Oldman – Tinker Tailor Soldier Spy
 Peter Mullan – Tyrannosaur

Best Actress
 Olivia Colman – Tyrannosaur
 Rebecca Hall – The Awakening
 Mia Wasikowska – Jane Eyre
 MyAnna Buring – Kill List
 Tilda Swinton – We Need to Talk about Kevin

Best Supporting Actor
 Michael Smiley – Kill List
 Tom Hardy – Tinker Tailor Soldier Spy
 Benedict Cumberbatch – Tinker Tailor Soldier Spy
 Eddie Marsan – Tyrannosaur
 Ezra Miller – We Need to Talk about Kevin

Best Supporting Actress
 Vanessa Redgrave – Coriolanus
 Felicity Jones – Albatross
 Carey Mulligan – Shame
 Sally Hawkins – Submarine
 Kathy Burke – Tinker Tailor Soldier Spy

Best Screenplay
 Richard Ayoade – Submarine
 John Michael McDonagh – The Guard
 Ben Wheatley, Amy Jump – Kill List
 Abi Morgan, Steve McQueen – Shame
 Lynne Ramsay, Rory Stewart Kinnear – We Need to Talk about Kevin

Most Promising Newcomer
 Tom Cullen – Weekend
 Jessica Brown Findlay – Albatross
 John Boyega – Attack the Block
 Craig Roberts – Submarine
 Yasmin Paige – Submarine

Best Achievement in Production
 Weekend
 Kill List
 Tyrannosaur
 Wild Bill
 You Instead

Best Technical Achievement
 Maria Djurkovic – Production Design – Tinker Tailor Soldier Spy
 Chris King, Gregers Sall – Editing – Senna
 Sean Bobbitt – Cinematography – Shame
 Joe Walker – Editing – Shame
 Seamus McGarvey – Cinematography – We Need to Talk about Kevin

Best British Documentary
 Senna
 Hell and Back Again
 Life in a Day
 Project Nim
 TT3D: Closer to the Edge

Best British Short
 CHALK
 0507
 LOVE AT FIRST SIGHT
 RITE
 ROUGH SKIN

Best Foreign Film
 A Separation
 Animal Kingdom
 Drive
 Pina
 The Skin I Live In

The Raindance Award
 LEAVING BAGHDAD
 ACTS OF GODFREY
 BLACK POND
 HOLLOW
 A THOUSAND KISSES DEEP

The Richard Harris Award
 Ralph Fiennes

The Variety Award
 Kenneth Branagh

The Special Jury Prize
 Graham Easton

References

External links
 BIFA homepage

British Independent Film Awards
2011 film awards
2011 in British cinema
2011 in London
December 2011 events in the United Kingdom